Plymouth is a city in Hennepin County in the U.S. state of Minnesota.

History

Plymouth's history can be traced to the pre-Columbian period around 1400 to 1500 AD. The original inhabitants were the Dakota. Their encampment was at the north end of Medicine Lake. The name Medicine Lake is derived from the Dakota word Mdewakanton, meaning "Lake of the Spirit." The Dakota named the lake after a warrior overturned his canoe and his body was never recovered.

Antoine LeCounte, a guide and explorer, was the first settler in this area. He arrived in 1848, but did not settle until 1852. He carried mail from the Red River of the North to points south, trading goods to Native Americans for horses on the way. LeCounte built the first cabin at what is now East Medicine Lake Boulevard at 29th Avenue North.

Plymouth's beginning as a town occurred in 1855 on the northwest shores of what is now known as Parkers Lake. A gristmill and other structures were built in the area. In the spring of 1857, when Parkers Lake flooded, the mill was taken down and moved to Wayzata.

As new settlers arrived in the area, they organized. The Hennepin County Board of Commissioners named the new settlement Plymouth. On April 19, 1858, a group of townspeople met at Francis Day's home to open elections for town offices. On May 11, 1858, the group voted to change the town's name to Medicine Lake. This was used once at the town meeting, but for reasons not recorded, it was never used again.

During the Dakota War of 1862 between white settlers and the Dakota at Fort Ridgely, near New Ulm, the settlers of Plymouth formed a militia. When the Civil War started, Plymouth paid its volunteers $25 to enlist. About this time, schools and churches were built and a post office was in Plymouth. By 1863, hotels were being built, with Medicine Lake becoming a local tourist destination.

By 1880, Plymouth had a population of 1,074. Farming was the city's dominant profession and remained so until the mid-1900s. Roads were built across Plymouth, providing access to other towns.

As the community's character evolved from rural to suburban, so did local government. Plymouth incorporated as a village on May 18, 1955. The city adopted the Council–Manager form of government on August 1, 1968.  Plymouth became a statutory city on February 7, 1974. It remained a statutory city until voters made it a home rule charter city by adopting a City Charter on November 3, 1992.

Geography

Interstate 494, U.S. Highway 169, and Minnesota State Highway 55 are three of the main routes in the city. Plymouth has 863 cul-de-sacs and 300 miles of city streets, which are maintained by the city's public works crews.

Climate
Plymouth has a humid continental climate, typical of the Midwestern United States, with very cold winters, and relatively hot, often humid summer days. Summer daytime temperatures average 83 °F (28 °C), with a low of around 60 °F (15 °C), while winter temperatures average only 23 °F (-5 °C) and a low of 3 °F (-16 °C). The highest recorded temperature in Plymouth was 99 °F (37 °C) in 1964, and the lowest was -39 °F (-39.4 °C) in 1977. Rain falls throughout the year, with the highest concentration falling in the summer months, with June being the rainiest with 120.3 mm of rain.

Demographics

2010 census
As of the census of 2010, there were 70,576 people, 28,663 households, and 19,230 families living in the city. The city's racial makeup was 84.2% White, 5.2% African American, 0.3% Native American, 6.9% Asian, 1.0% from other races, and 2.3% from two or more races. Hispanic or Latino of any race were 3.0% of the population.

There were 28,663 households, of which 32.4% had children under the age of 18 living with them, 55.6% were married couples living together, 8.5% had a female householder with no husband present, 3.0% had a male householder with no wife present, and 32.9% were non-families. 26.4% of all households were made up of individuals, and 8% had someone living alone who was 65 years of age or older. The average household size was 2.42 and the average family size was 2.96.

The median age in the city was 39.5 years. 23.9% of residents were under the age of 18; 6.9% were between the ages of 18 and 24; 27.1% were from 25 to 44; 30.1% were from 45 to 64; and 12.1% were 65 years of age or older. The gender makeup of the city was 48.4% male and 51.6% female.

2000 census
As of the census of 2000, there were 65,894 people, 24,820 households, and 17,647 families living in the city. The population density was 2,002.0 persons per square mile (773.1/km). The racial makeup of the city was 91.36% White, 2.71% African American, 0.33% Native American, 3.79% Asian, 0.01% Pacific Islander, 0.50% from other races, and 1.31% from two or more races. Hispanic or Latino of any race were 1.64% of the population. 27.0% were of German, 13.1% Norwegian, 7.8% Irish and 7.5% Swedish ancestry.

There were 24,820 households, out of which 37.8% had children under the age of 18 living with them, 61.2% were married couples living together, 7.6% had a female householder with no husband present, and 28.9% were non-families. 21.8% of all households were made up of individuals, and 4.7% had someone living alone who was 65 years of age or older. The average household size was 2.60 and the average family size was 3.09.

In the city, the population was spread out, with 27.1% under the age of 18, 7.4% from 18 to 24, 33.0% from 25 to 44, 25.0% from 45 to 64, and 7.6% who were 65 years of age or older. The median age was 36 years. For every 100 females, there were 97.1 males. For every 100 females age 18 and over, there were 95.5 males.

The median income for a household in the city was $77,008, and the median income for a family was $90,134. Males had a median income of $59,751 versus $38,111 for females. The city's per capita income was $36,309.  About 1.5% of families and 2.6% of the population were below the poverty line, including 2.0% of those under age 18 and 1.5% of those age 65 or over.

Government and politics
Plymouth operates under a council-manager form of government that comprises a mayor and six council members.

Plymouth is in two Minnesota Senate districts, represented by state senators Ann Johnson Stewart and Ron Latz. Plymouth's state representatives are Ryan Winkler, Ginny Klevorn, and Patty Acomb. Plymouth is in Minnesota's 3rd congressional district, represented by Dean Phillips. Until 2018, a majority of the city usually voted for Republican candidates.

Education

Public schools

Five school districts serve Plymouth: Wayzata Public Schools (ISD 284), Robbinsdale Area Schools (ISD 281), Osseo School District (279), West Metro Education Program (ISD 6069) and Hopkins School District (ISD 270). Most of the city, particularly the western, northwestern, and southern areas, is served by Wayzata Public Schools. Robbinsdale Area Schools serves the east-central area. The Osseo District includes the northeast area and Hopkins includes the southeast corner. Some students attend public schools in other school districts their families choose under Minnesota's open enrollment statute.

List of Wayzata Public Schools:

 Birchview Elementary School
 Fair School Pilgrim Lane
 Gleason Lake Elementary School 
 Greenwood Elementary School
 Kimberly Lane Elementary School
 Meadow Ridge Elementary School
 North Woods Elementary School
 Oakwood Elementary School
 Plymouth Creek Elementary School
 Plymouth Middle School
 Robbinsdale Armstrong High School
 Sunset Hill Elementary School
 Wayzata East Middle School
 Wayzata Central Middle School
 Wayzata West Middle School
 Wayzata High School
 Zachary Lane Elementary School

Wayzata High School, operated by the Wayzata School District, has approximately 3,500 students in grades 9 to 12, making it Minnesota's largest secondary school by enrollment. The school is part of the Lake Conference. In 2008, Newsweek ranked the school 940th on its "List of the 1300 Top High Schools in America."

List of Robbinsdale School District schools:
 Robbinsdale Armstrong High School
 Robbinsdale Plymouth Middle School
 Fair School Pilgrim Lake
 Zachary Lane Elementary School

List of West Metro Education Program (WMEP) District 6069 schools:
 The InterDistrict Downtown School (IDDS)
 FAIR (Fine Arts Interdisciplinary Resource) School

Private schools and colleges
 Association Free Lutheran Bible School and Seminary
Fourth Baptist Christian School
 Central Baptist Theological Seminary
 Providence Academy 
 West Lutheran High School

Economy
OneBeacon, Select Comfort, Christopher & Banks and Tonka Water are headquartered in Plymouth.

Principal employers
According to Plymouth's 2020 Comprehensive Annual Financial Report, the city's principal employers are:

Notable people
 Marion Barber III – former NFL running back
 Rudy Boschwitz – U.S. senator who lived in Plymouth. 
 Dani Cameranesi – Olympic Gold Medalist
 Ariya Daivari – professional wrestler
 Jonas H. Howe – abolitionist, artist, and state legislator
 Jeff Johnson – Hennepin County Commissioner
 Evan Kaufmann (born 1984) – professional ice hockey player
 Amy Klobuchar – U.S. senator and 2020 Democratic presidential candidate
 James Laurinaitis – NFL linebacker
 Adrianne Lenker - singer/songwriter and lead vocalist of Big Thief
 Mark Parrish – former NHL All Star
 Rem Pitlick – NHL player
 Andrew Tang – chess grandmaster
 A.J. Tarpley – NFL linebacker
 Blake Wheeler – NHL player

References

External links
 City website
 

 
Cities in Minnesota
Cities in Hennepin County, Minnesota
Populated places established in 1852
1852 establishments in Minnesota Territory